The Hoher Sonnblick (also Rauriser Sonnblick) is a glaciated mountain,  high, on the main Alpine chain in the Goldberg Group on the border between the Austrian states of Carinthia and Salzburg. At its summit is the  Sonnblick Observatory and the Alpine refuge hut of Zittelhaus.

Location and area 

The mountain rises at the head of the Hüttwinkltal valley, the upper part of the Raurisertal, on the Alpine divide. It is a mighty massif with a characteristic rock pyramid on the summit block and a great North Face above Kolm-Saigurn. The highest summit of the Goldberg Group is not the Hoher Sonnblick, however, but the 3,254-metre-high Hocharn to the north.

On the steep summit, at a height of 3,106 metres, is a meteorological observatory, the Sonnblick Observatory, and an Alpine refuge hut, the Zittelhaus (also written Zittlhaus). At a height of 2,718 metres is the Rojacher Hut and at  2,175 metres is the Schutzhaus Neubau. Both huts are managed during the summer months.

In the area of the Sonnblick there are historical  gold mines, which gave their name to the mountain range around the Sonnblick, the Goldberg Group. On the mountainsides still stand the ruins of the gold diggings, Kulm-Saigurn is an ancient mountain mining settlement. At the foot of the Sonnblick you can still successfully pan for gold – albeit less productively than the historical mines which played a key role in the wealth of the Prince-Archbishopric of Salzburg.

Routes 
Kolm-Saigurn – Neubau – Rojacher Hütte – Hoher Sonnblick, 4–5 hrs, 1,500 metres climb
Heiligenblut – Fleißkehre – Gasthof "Alter Pocher" (end of the public road) – Zirmsee – Kleinfleißkees – Hoher Sonnblick, 5–6 h (4–5 h ab „Alter Pocher“), 1,800 metres climb. No refuge huts between "Alter Pocher" and the Sonnblick.

Literature and maps 
 Liselotte Buchenauer, Peter Holl: Alpine Club Guide Ankogel- und Goldberggruppe. Bergverlag Rudolf Rother, Munich, 1986. 
 Ingeborg Auer, Reinhard Böhm, Martin Leymüller, Wolfgang Schöner: Das Klima des Sonnblicks –  Klimaatlas und Klimatographie der GAW-Station Sonnblick einschließlich der umgebenden Gebirgsregion, ZAMG, Vienna, 2002, ISSN 1016-6254.
 Alpine Club Map Sheet 42, 1:25,000 series, Sonnblick

Climate

References

External links 

Glacier survey by the Central Office of Meteorology and Geodynamics and the BOKU Vienna, as well as ski tours on the Sonnblick
Website of the Sonnblick Observatory

Alpine three-thousanders
Mountains of the Alps
Mountains of Salzburg (state)
Goldberg Group